The Community Collaborative Rain, Hail and Snow Network, or CoCoRaHS, is a network of volunteer weather observers in the United States, Canada, and the Bahamas that take daily readings of precipitation and report them to a central data store over the internet. The program is an example of citizen science.

History
The network was started in 1997 in Larimer County, Colorado, after a flash flood in Spring Creek killed five people and damaged structures in the city of Fort Collins, Colorado, including hundreds of millions of dollars in damage to the Colorado State University campus.
The severity of the flood and its widespread spatial variability surprised meteorologists, and former assistant state climatologist for the state of Colorado, Nolan Doesken, asked for precipitation measurements from private citizens in the area. About 300 responded to his emergency request for data. Said Doesken later, "The results of the data showed that more than 14 in. (36 cm) of rain fell over southwest Fort Collins, the area where the flood waters originated, while less than 2 in. (5 cm) of rain fell only 3–4 mi (5–6 km) east. The enthusiastic interest shown by volunteers and the great value of the data verified the need for such a service, and CoCoRaHS was born." The program was originally confined to Colorado (the first "Co" in "CoCoRaHS" stood for "Colorado" instead of "Community"), but began expanding to other states during the 2000s.

Users
CoCoRaHS is used by a wide variety of organizations and individuals. The National Weather Service (NWS), other meteorologists, hydrologists, emergency managers, city utilities (water supply, water conservation, storm water), transportation departments, insurance adjusters, the USDA, engineers, mosquito control, ranchers and farmers, outdoor & recreation interests, teachers, students, and neighbors in the community are examples of people who use CoCoRaHS data.

Other programs
A similar program, the Significant Weather Observing Program (SWOP), was begun independently in around the year 2000 by the National Weather Service Lincoln, Illinois. CoCoRaHS data supplements the more rigorous data from the national program with increased spatial and temporal resolution. Real-time data is also provided by the Citizen Weather Observer Program (CWOP), whose users operate weather stations that automatically report over the internet, and which supplements the more rigorous data reported by formal surface weather observation stations. The earliest and thus critically important for its long-term historical record from respective locations is the Cooperative Observer program of manually recorded daily summaries.

Sponsors
The National Oceanic and Atmospheric Administration (NOAA) and the National Science Foundation (NSF) are major sponsors of CoCoRaHS and the Bureau of Land Management (BLM) is also a partner. Other organizations have contributed either financially, and/or with supplies and equipment. Many other organizations and individuals have also pitched in time and resources to help keep the network up and running.

Status
As of 2015 all fifty states, the District of Columbia, and the Commonwealth of Puerto Rico participate in CoCoRaHS. The CoCoRaHS Canada network began in Manitoba in December 2011 following a massive flood in that province. As of 2014, the network had expanded to the Canadian provinces of Alberta, British Columbia, Manitoba, New Brunswick, Newfoundland and Labrador, Nova Scotia, Ontario, Prince Edward Island, Quebec, and Saskatchewan. There were over 20,000 participants as of March 2015.

See also
 Skywarn
 Safecast (organization)

References

External links
 CoCoRaHS website and blog
 Twitter profile
 Facebook page
 NOAA Cooperative Weather Observer Program

Meteorological data and networks
Citizen science